USS Concord (Gunboat No. 3/PG-3) was a member of the  of steel-hulled, twin-screw gunboats in the United States Navy in the late 19th and early 20th centuries. She was the second U.S. Navy ship named in honor of the town of Concord, Massachusetts, site of the Battle of Concord in the American Revolutionary War.

The contract to build Concord was awarded to N. F. Palmer & Co. of Philadelphia in the 1888 fiscal year. Her hull was subcontracted to the Delaware River Iron Shipbuilding & Engine Works which laid down her keel in May 1888. Concord was launched in March 1890. She was equipped with two steam engines which were supplemented with three schooner-rigged masts. The ship's main battery consisted of six  guns and was augmented by an assortment of smaller caliber guns.

After her 1891 commissioning, Concord spent the next few years sailing along the East Coast, in the West Indies, and in the Gulf of Mexico. Concord cruised on the Asiatic Station—interrupted only by a short stint on the Alaskan sealing patrol—from 1893 until May 1896, when she began a year out of commission at San Francisco. In January 1898, Concord returned to the Asiatic Station, and joined Admiral George Dewey's fleet for 1 May 1898 Battle of Manila Bay, a decisive American victory over the Spanish Fleet in the Spanish–American War. After the battle, Concord supported United States Army operations in the Philippines in the Philippine–American War. For the rest of her active career, Concord patrolled off the Mexican and Alaskan coasts and served on the Yangtze Patrol. She was decommissioned in 1909 and served as a barracks ship until 1914, and as a quarantine ship at the Columbia River Quarantine Station near Astoria, Oregon for the Public Health Service until 1929, at which time she was returned to the Navy and sold.

Design and construction 
The Yorktown class gunboats—unofficially considered third-class cruisers—were the product of a United States Navy design attempt to produce compact ships with good sea-keeping abilities and, yet, able to carry a heavy battery. Concord was authorized in the 1888 fiscal year, and the contract for her construction was awarded to N. F. Palmer & Co. of Chester, Pennsylvania. The hull for Concord was sublet by Palmer to the Delaware River Iron Shipbuilding & Engine Works and built to the Navy's Bureau of Construction and Repair design. The mechanical design was patterned after the layout for older sister ship  developed by William Cramp & Sons .

Concords keel was laid down in May 1888, and the ship was launched on 8 March 1890, sponsored by Minnie Darlington Coates, the daughter of Major Joseph R. T. Coates, the mayor of Chester. Among those in attendance at the launch ceremony was sculptor Daniel Chester French.

Layout 
At the waterline was a turtleback deck of ⅜-inch (9.5 mm) steel that formed a watertight seal over the lower spaces. Below this armored deck were twelve compartments separated by watertight bulkheads; the spaces above were equipped with watertight doors intended to be closed during battle.

Above the armored deck, Concord had forecastle and poop decks with an open gun deck that spanned the length of the ship between them. The conning tower was located forward on the forecastle deck and was oval-shaped to deflect shot.

Propulsion 
The cylinders of each engine were 22, 31, and 51 inches (56, 79, and 130 cm) in diameter and had a  stroke.

The engines, situated in separate watertight compartments, were each fed by a pair of coal-fired boilers. At a near top-speed of 16 knots, the ship could cover  in 6½ days; at the more economical speed of  she could cruise  over 62 days.

To supplement her steam power plant, Concord was built with three masts that were schooner-rigged. The steam and sail combination was expected to allow Concord to remain at sea for months at a time during wartime.

Armament 
Two were mounted on the forecastle deck, two on the poop deck, and the other pair amidships on the gun deck.

Concords secondary battery consisted of two 6-pounder guns, two 3-pounder guns, and two 1-pounder guns. All were based on designs of the French arms company Hotchkiss.

Career 
USS Concord (PG-3) was commissioned on 14 February 1891 under the command of Commander O. A. Batcheller. Concord operated on the coast of New England, and sailed from New York City on 17 November 1891 on a cruise to the West Indies and South America with her squadron, then arrived at New Orleans, Louisiana, on 27 April 1892 and cruised up the Mississippi River as far as Cairo, Illinois, visiting various ports en route.

Returning to New York on 13 June 1892, Concord made another cruise to the West Indies late that year, and arrived back at Norfolk, Virginia, on 5 December. She participated in International Naval Review held at Norfolk and New York in March and April 1893, and in June sailed from Norfolk for the Far East, calling at the Azores, Gibraltar, Malta, Port Said, Bangkok, and Saigon before arriving at Hong Kong on 30 October. She cruised on the Asiatic Station until 29 May 1894 when she arrived at Unalaska. She cruised on sealing patrol in the North Pacific to carry out the provisions of the treaty between the United States and United Kingdom, which empowered Concord to seize any vessel violating the laws protecting valuable fur seals. She gathered hydrographic information to correct Bering Sea charts and conduct scientific observations of the fur seals.

Concord returned to the Asiatic Station in September 1894 and continued to serve in the Far East until returning to San Francisco on 3 May 1896. She was placed out of commission for repairs between 27 May 1896 and 22 May 1897. After a cruise to Alaskan waters 1 July – 29 November, she sailed from Mare Island 8 January 1898 for the Asiatic Station under the command of Commander (later Rear Admiral) Asa Walker. With the declaration of war between Spain and the United States in April, Concord joined Admiral George Dewey's squadron at Mirs Bay near Hong Kong on the 24th and sailed for the Philippines. On 1 May, Concord participated in the Battle of Manila Bay that resulted in American control of the Philippines.

Concord resumed her patrol on station in August 1898, but returned to the Philippines on 19 December to assist in putting down the insurrection. Her duty consisted of patrolling the coast to restrict insurgent movements and shipping; bombarding various strongholds; and aiding United States Army operations. Except for a voyage to Guam in March 1900 to deliver stores, and a brief voyage to Hong Kong for repairs, Concord remained in Philippine waters until June 1901, when she sailed by way of Alaskan waters to San Francisco, arriving 28 September 1901. She cruised with the Fleet in Mexican waters, then went out of commission on 26 February 1902 at Mare Island.

Recommissioned on 15 June 1903 Concord operated along the North American coast from Alaska to Panama and to Hawaii and Alaska until decommissioned at Bremerton, Washington, on 25 August 1904. Concord was commissioned again on 16 September 1905 and sailed from Bremerton on 24 December 1905 for operations in the Philippines. Remaining there until March 1906, Concord sailed to China. Until 1908 she remained in the Far East serving at times on the Yangtze Patrol and as station ship at Shanghai and Canton.

Concord served as station ship at Guam from 2 January to 10 September 1909, then sailed to Puget Sound Navy Yard where she arrived on 11 October.
She was decommissioned for the final time on 4 November 1909, and assigned as barracks ship for the Washington Naval Militia at Seattle. She was transferred to the Public Health Service of the Treasury Department on 15 June 1914 and served as a stationary quarantine barge at Astoria, Oregon. Returned to naval custody on 19 March 1929, she was sold on 28 June 1929.

Legacy
In August 1915 two of the Concord's six-inch guns were placed in the War Garden of Woodland Park, Seattle, WA.  The Seattle Times of 15 August stated: "Two six-inch guns from the United States cruiser Concord which saw active service at the battle of Manila, yesterday afternoon were brought to Seattle from Bremerton under the direction of the United Spanish War Veterans, to be mounted in Woodland Park in the near future.  W. S. F. Quick, chairman of the board of managers of the United Spanish War Veterans Club of Seattle, yesterday signed a receipt for government property valued at $18,000, which gives the local veterans practical possession of the pieces from now on.  The two guns when mounted will be known as Battery Dewey." These guns today are in the Veterans Memorial Museum in Chehalis, Washington.

Awards
Dewey Medal
Navy Expeditionary Medal
Spanish Campaign Medal
Philippine Campaign Medal

Notes

References

Bibliography 

 
 
 
 
 

Yorktown-class gunboats
Ships built by the Delaware River Iron Ship Building and Engine Works
Ships built in Philadelphia
1890 ships
Philippine–American War ships of the United States
Spanish–American War gunboats of the United States